SKHS may refer to:
 Norwegian National Academy of Craft and Art Industry, Oslo, Norway
 Seven Kings High School, Ilford, Essex, England
 South Kingstown High School, Wakefield, Rhode Island, United States
 South Kitsap High School, Port Orchard, Washington, United States